Zinc finger CCHC domain-containing protein 8 is a protein that in humans is encoded by the ZCCHC8 gene.

References

Further reading